Stora grabbars och tjejers märke (lit. Big Boys' and Girls' Badge) is an honorary award within Swedish sports, created in 1928 by Bo Ekelund. The recipients are called a 'Stor Grabb' (lit. Big Boy) and has to gather a certain number of points according to different rules depending on the sport in question. The title is awarded in several different sports, such as ice hockey, football, athletics, free diving, miniature golf, and others. Since 1989, women can also gain the title, then called Stora tjejers märke (lit. Big Girls' Badge), and the recipient is called a 'Stor tjej' (lit. Big Girl).

Recipients

Men

Women

See also
List of bandy players awarded Stora Grabbars och Tjejers Märke
List of ice hockey players awarded Stora Grabbars och Tjejers Märke

References

Stora Grabbars och Tjejers Märke players